Parsian Shahr-e Qods Futsal Club was an Iranian professional futsal club based in Shahr-e Qods.

Season by season
The table below chronicles the achievements of the Club in various competitions.

Last updated: July 20, 2021

References 

Futsal clubs in Iran
Sport in Tehran